Jock Jones (born March 13, 1968) is a former American football linebacker. He played for the Cleveland Browns from 1990 to 1991 and for the Phoenix Cardinals from 1991 to 1993.

References

1968 births
Living people
American football linebackers
Virginia Tech Hokies football players
Cleveland Browns players
Phoenix Cardinals players
Baltimore Stallions players